This article lists the events in 1721 in Russia.

Incumbents
 Monarch – Peter I - oversaw the reorganization of the Tsardom of Russia into the Russian Empire.

Events

 Signing of the Treaty of Nystad - final peace treaty of the Great Northern War, officially ending it.

Births

Deaths

References

 
Years of the 18th century in Russia